Jan Schur (born 27 November 1962) is a retired track cyclist and road cyclist from East Germany, who represented his native country at the 1988 Summer Olympics in Seoul, South Korea. There he won the gold medal in the men's team time trial, alongside Uwe Ampler, Mario Kummer, and Maik Landsmann. He was a Stasi informer under the codename "Reinhold" from 1981 to 1989.

Schur was a professional road cyclist from 1990 to 1994. His father Täve Schur (born 1931) was also a famous cyclist.

Major results

1982
1st Stage 7 Tour de Pologne
1987
3rd Overall International Tour of Hellas
1st Stage 7
4th Overall Tour of Sweden
1st Stage 6b (ITT)
1988
1st  Team time trial, Summer Olympics (with Uwe Ampler, Mario Kummer and Maik Landsmann)
1st Stage 4 GP Tell
3rd Overall Tour du Vaucluse
1st Stage 1
1989
1st Stage 7 International Tour of Hellas
1990
6th Tour of Flanders
1994
10th Nice-Alassio

References

External links

1962 births
Living people
Sportspeople from Leipzig
People from Bezirk Leipzig
East German male cyclists
East German track cyclists
Olympic cyclists of East Germany
Cyclists at the 1988 Summer Olympics
Olympic gold medalists for East Germany
Medalists at the 1988 Summer Olympics
Olympic medalists in cycling
UCI Road World Champions (elite men)
Recipients of the Patriotic Order of Merit in gold
People of the Stasi
Cyclists from Saxony